Haydn Keenan  (c. 1951) is an Australian producer, writer and director.

Select credits
27A (1974) - producer
Going Down (1983) - producer, director
Pandemonium (1987) - director
Persons of Interest: The Asio Files (2012) (documentary)

References

External links

Street Smart Films - Keenan's company

Living people
Australian film directors
Year of birth missing (living people)